Luis Leal (21 July 1929 – 12 July 2013) was a Chilean footballer. He competed in the men's tournament at the 1952 Summer Olympics.

References

External links
 
 

1929 births
2013 deaths
Chilean footballers
Chile international footballers
Olympic footballers of Chile
Footballers at the 1952 Summer Olympics
Place of birth missing
Association football defenders
Naval de Talcahuano footballers